Shamaine Buencamino (née Centenera; born February 28, 1965) is a Filipino actress  and mental health advocate who has appeared in more than 100 movies and television series and shows.

Personal life
She married Filipino actor Nonie Buencamino and has four children, including the actress Julia Buencamino, who died in 2015 due to suicide.

Filmography

References

External links
 On IMDb

1965 births
Living people
Filipino television actresses
Filipino film actresses
Actresses from Camarines Sur
People from Naga, Camarines Sur
University of the Philippines Diliman alumni
20th-century Filipino actresses
21st-century Filipino actresses
ABS-CBN personalities
GMA Network personalities